Wang Qinruo ( 962 – 22 December 1025), courtesy name Dingguo, was an official in China's Northern Song Dynasty. He was the chancellor from 1017 to 1019 during Emperor Zhenzong's reign and from 1023 to 1025 during Emperor Renzong's reign.

Wang Qinruo led the compilation of Prime Tortoise of the Record Bureau, an important encyclopedia.

Wang Qinruo had a few very unpopular proposals, including moving the capital to southern China. Moreover, he appeared to have a personal vendetta against the upright official Kou Zhun and tried hard to have the latter demoted. History of Song recorded that Emperor Renzong believed Wang Qinruo treacherous, and that during his time Wang Qinruo was nicknamed by the population as one of the "Five Devils", along with Ding Wei, Lin Te, Chen Pengnian and Liu Chenggui.

In fiction
In the popular legends of Generals of the Yang Family, the antagonist Wang Qin is based on Wang Qinruo. In some versions Wang Qin is even a spy from the Liao Dynasty.

References

Song dynasty chancellors
960s births
1025 deaths
11th-century Chinese historians
Song dynasty politicians from Jiangxi
Politicians from Xinyu